NGC 1407 is an elliptical galaxy in Eridanus. It is at a distance of 76 million light-years from Earth. It is the brightest galaxy in the NGC 1407 Group, part of the Eridanus Group, with NGC 1407 being its brightest member. NGC 1400, the second-brightest of the group lies 11.8 arcmin away. 

NGC 1407 is X-ray luminous, with high hot gas Fe abundance, and with evidence of recurrent radio outbursts. In the central area of the galaxy are present old stars, with mean age 12.0 ± 1.1 Gyrs, that are metal rich and with supersolar abundances of α-elements. Observations indicate that NGC 1407 hasn't recently undergone strong star-formation activity. The galaxy hosts a supermassive black hole with a mass 1.12 ± 0.42 billion solar masses, based on velocity dispersion.

The galaxy was discovered by 6 October 1785 by William Herschel.

Gallery

References

External links 
 

Eridanus Group
Eridanus (constellation)
Elliptical galaxies
1407
013505